Kuhsar Rural District is in the Central District of Hashtrud County, East Azerbaijan province, Iran. At the National Census of 2006, its population was 4,318 in 960 households. There were 3,806 inhabitants in 1,062 households at the following census of 2011. At the most recent census of 2016, the population of the rural district was 3,559 in 1,123 households. The largest of its 16 villages was Owshendel, with 853 people.

References 

Hashtrud County

Rural Districts of East Azerbaijan Province

Populated places in East Azerbaijan Province

Populated places in Hashtrud County